The first indirect presidential election was held in Hungary on 3 August 1990, following the transition to multi-party democracy. Árpád Göncz (SZDSZ), Speaker of the National Assembly and acting head of state, was elected President with an absolute majority.

Background
During the era of transition from communist one-party system into multi-party democracy, reburial of Imre Nagy proved to be a catalyst event; the hard-line Károly Grósz was outranked by a four-member collective presidency of the reformist wing within the Hungarian Socialist Workers' Party (MSZMP) on 26 June 1989. The ruling communist party began discussions with the opposition groups within the framework of the so-called Round Table Talks. The question of the post-communist presidential position was one of the most problematic disputes between the parties. The MSZMP suggested a directly elected semi-presidential system, however this proposal was strongly refused by the sharply anti-communist SZDSZ and Fidesz, because the reformer communist Imre Pozsgay was the most popular Hungarian politician in those months. The MSZMP leaders presumed Pozsgay, a leader of the Communists' radical reformer faction, would win. The smaller opposition parties wanted a parliamentary system, proportional representation, and a weak presidency. However, they too believed that Pozsgay would be elected president. In August 1989, József Antall, leader of the Hungarian Democratic Forum (MDF) presented a new proposal (ceremonial presidential system with indirect elections by the parliament, but the first election by the people). Excluding SZDSZ, Fidesz and LIGA, the remaining five opposition groups and the MSZMP accepted and signed the proposal. However, following collecting signatures by Fidesz and SZDSZ, a four-part referendum was held on 26 November 1989, where the voters chose "yes" for the question of "Should the president be elected after parliamentary elections?"

In the end, the implicit deal on the presidency (the only place where the Communists appeared to have gotten the upper hand) reached in the Round Table Talks was reversed: when the MSZMP dissolved itself in early October and became the Hungarian Socialist Party (MSZP), a majority of members as well as MPs failed to join the new party, and Pozsgay was not elected its leader. The Hungarian Democratic Forum (MDF) won the first democratically free parliamentary election in March 1990, while SZDSZ came to the second place with 92 MPs. József Antall became Prime Minister and entered coalition with FKGP and the Christian Democratic People's Party (KDNP). As there were several two-thirds laws according to the Hungarian Constitution, Antall concluded pact with SZDSZ, under which the liberal opposition party could nominee a candidate for the position of President of Hungary, in exchange for contribution to the constitutional amendments. According to some opinions, the pact concluded specifically for the person of Árpád Göncz.
 
The Socialist Party themselves used the initiative to force a vote on direct election of the president on 29 July 1990, but this failed due to a turnout of just 14%. Instead of a Communist candidate chosen in direct elections before the election of a new parliament, the parliamentary parties unanimously nominated SZDSZ politician and notable anti-communist Árpád Göncz to the position of President of Hungary.

Results

Aftermath
Parliamentary speaker and, consequently, acting head of state Árpád Göncz was elected for a full term as president by the National Assembly by 295 votes to 13. After taking the oath before the new legislative speaker György Szabad (MDF), Göncz stated in his inaugural speech that:

References

Sources
.
.
.
.

1990
Hungary
1990 in Hungary
August 1990 events in Europe